The FIBA Europe Cup Final MVP, previously the Final Four MVP, is an annual award that is given to the best player of the finals of a given FIBA Europe Cup season. The award was handed out in 2016 and 2021, seasons in which there was a final four format. From 2022, the award is given to the best player in the final series.

Winners

{| class="wikitable sortable plainrowheaders"
|+FIBA Europe Cup Final Four MVP winners
!scope="col"|Season
!scope="col"|Player
!scope="col"|Nationality
!scope="col"|Club
!scope="col" class="unsortable"|Ref(s)
|-
|2015–16
!scope="row"|
|
| Fraport Skyliners
|style="text-align:center"|
|-
|2020–21
!scope="row"|
|
| Ironi Nes Ziona
|style="text-align:center"|
|-
|2021–22
!scope="row"|
|
| Bahçeşehir Koleji
|style="text-align:center"|
|}

References

F4 MVP